Eastend is a town in south-west part of the Canadian province of Saskatchewan, situated approximately  north of the Montana border and  east of the Alberta border.

The town is best known for the nearby discovery of a Tyrannosaurus rex skeleton nicknamed "Scotty" in 1994. The town has used the discovery of this fossil as the main centrepiece in the construction of a museum called the T.rex Discovery Centre, which opened on May 30, 2003. The centre is operated by the Royal Saskatchewan Museum, and contains the RSM Fossil Research Station. Eastend has been home to many famous residents, including the writer Wallace Stegner, who lived in the town between 1917 and 1921 and featured it as the village Whitemud in his book Wolf Willow. Today, the former home of Stegner is used as an artists' retreat which can be rented out by artists to focus on their work.

History
The Eastend Area is rich in history and geology, and is rife with paleontological sites. A Métis settlement developed north of Eastend, and in the 1870s a Hudson’s Bay Company trading post was established in the region. In the mid 1880s as bison populations were being decimated on the eastern plains, the area became an important hunting ground that nearby First Nations tribes regularly fought over. The post only lasted one season, due to hostilities between the neighbouring tribes. Many years later, this site became known as Chimney Coulee – the name being derived from the remnants of stone chimneys that were once a part of Métis homes.

In the late 1870s the North-West Mounted Police established a satellite detachment of the Fort Walsh site in Chimney Coulee, and gave the area the name of "East End", due to its location on the East End of the Cypress Hills. When the Mounties moved to the nearby townsite years later, they condensed the name into one word, and the town was Christened "Eastend". The first ranch was established in the area in 1883, and a ranch house was built in the town in 1902, the community’s first residence, which remains occupied to this day. Surveyors came to the area in 1905, a precursor to the expansion of the railway.

In 1913, construction of the railway in the area began. Lumber was freighted from Gull Lake, Saskatchewan to Eastend until the railroad reached town in May, 1914. Many young people began coming to the townsite, and tents were placed across the river to accommodate them. J.C. Strong, the original owner of the townsite, donated land to build the first church, cemetery, and a lot for the first baby born in Eastend. She was born in June, 1914 and was named Eastena. On her 21st birthday she donated the lot given to her to the United Church.

Flood of 1952
In the fall and winter of 1951 the town saw a record amount of snow. In the spring of 1952, unusually warm weather melted the snow quickly and caused a massive flood in Eastend. The town was evacuated and residents found refuge with friends and family that lived in nearby towns. The water receded after three days, leaving immense amounts of destruction in its wake. A few years later a dyke was constructed along the river to prevent history from repeating itself.

Discovery of "Scotty" the Tyrannosaurs Rex 

On August 16, 1991, then high school teacher, Robert Gebhardt from Eastend joined local palaeontologists on a prospecting expedition to the exposed bedrock along the Frenchman River Valley to learn how fossils are found and identified in the field. Within a half a day, he discovered the base of a heavily worn tooth, and a vertebra from the tail, both suggesting that they belonged to a T. rex.

Geography
Eastend is located south-east of the Cypress Hills, east from Ravenscrag Butte and south from Anxiety Butte. The Eastend Reservoir was built upstream from the community.

The Eastend Formation, a stratigraphical unit of the Western Canadian Sedimentary Basin was named for the town and was first defined in outcrops close to the settlement. The Eastend Formation was the final marine deposit on the plains, and was home to many marine animals.

Demographics 

Infrastructure

Saskatchewan Highway 13 and highway 614 intersect in Eastend. The Great Western Railway (formerly the Altawan subdivision of the Canadian Pacific Railway) tracks also pass through the town.
The nearest major airports are Saskatoon John G. Diefenbaker International Airport, Regina International Airport and Calgary International Airport.

Attractions
 T.rex Discovery Centre is a world class facility to house the fossil record of the Eastend area started many years before the discovery of "Scotty" the T.Rex in 1994.
 The Eastend Community Swimming Pool was built in 1971, and remodelled in 2016. It now features a 25m outdoor swimming pool, a splash park, and two waterslides. 
 Jones Peak is located six miles south-west of Eastend. It was named after H.S. "Corky" Jones for his tireless work as an amateur paleontologist and in preserving the history of Eastend.
 Streambank Golf Course, a 9-hole golf course located in town.

Regional attractions 
 Big Muddy Badlands is a series of badlands in southern Saskatchewan and northern Montana along Big Muddy Creek. They are found in the Big Muddy Valley, a cleft of erosion and sandstone along Big Muddy Creek. The valley was formed when it was part of an ancient glacial meltwater channel that carried great quantities of water south-eastward during the last ice age.
 Cypress Hills Interprovincial Park straddles the southern Alberta-Saskatchewan border, located north-west of Robsart. It is Canada's first and only interprovincial park.
 Cypress Hills Vineyard & Winery is open by appointment only from Christmas until May 14.
 Fort Walsh is part of the Cypress Hills Interprovincial Park. As a National Historic Site of Canada the area possesses National Historical Significance. It was established as a North-West Mounted Police (NWMP) fort after and at the location of the Cypress Hills Massacre.
 Grasslands National Park represents the Prairie Grasslands natural region, protecting one of the nation's few remaining areas of undisturbed dry mixed-grass/shortgrass prairie grassland. The park is located in the WWF-defined Northern short grasslands ecoregion, which spans across much of Southern Saskatchewan, Southern Alberta, and the northern Great Plains states in the United States. 
Native prairie grass helps keep the sand together.
 Pine Cree Regional Park

Notable residents 
 Billy R. Bascom (1925-2010), rodeo cowboy, trick rider, rodeo clown, artist and designer, Hollywood actor, college teacher, manager of Roy Rogers Riding Stables, Hall of Fame inductee
 Charles S. Bascom (1920-1944), cowboy, WW II Canadian Air Force serviceman, military honoree
 Earl W. Bascom (1906-1995), rodeo pioneer, Father of Modern Rodeo, rodeoed in Eastend, rounded-up horses on the 76 Ranch and the Seven Crowfoot Ranch, rodeo producer, inventor, cowboy artist and sculptor, Hollywood actor, school teacher, Hall of Fame inductee
 Grant L. Bascom (1924-2009), cowboy, poet, sculptor
 John W. Bascom (1869–1948), frontier lawman, rancher, rodeo pioneer, rodeo stock contractor, Hall of Fame inductee
 Melvin Bascom (1903–1987), rodeo pioneer and champion, rancher, rodeo stock contractor, Hall of Fame inductee
 Raymond Bascom (1901–1943), rodeo pioneer, rancher, champion chariot racer and Roman standing racer, racehorse trainer, Hall of Fame inductee
 Wesley L. Bascom (1929-2018), rodeo cowboy and trick rider, rancher, school teacher, photographer, artist, Hall of Fame inductee 
 Sharon Butala, Canadian author who resides on a ranch outside of Eastend
 George Haddad (1918–2010), renowned pianist, born and raised in Eastend
 Wallace Stegner, Pulitzer Prize–winning writer and environmentalist who lived in Eastend from 1917 and 1921

See also
Robsart Art Works
List of towns in Saskatchewan
List of communities in Saskatchewan

References

External links

Towns in Saskatchewan
White Valley No. 49, Saskatchewan
Division No. 4, Saskatchewan